Tibor Helyi (born 19 April 1963) is a Hungarian sprint canoer who competed from the 1980s. He won four medals in the K-4 10000 m event at the ICF Canoe Sprint World Championships with a gold (1985), a silver (1987) and two bronzes (1982, 1986).

Helyi also finished ninth in the K-2 1000 m event at the 1988 Summer Olympics in Seoul.

References

External links
 
 

1963 births
Canoeists at the 1988 Summer Olympics
Hungarian male canoeists
Living people
Olympic canoeists of Hungary
ICF Canoe Sprint World Championships medalists in kayak
20th-century Hungarian people